Pseudotessellarctia is a genus of moths in the family Erebidae.

Species
 Pseudotessellarctia brunneitincta Hampson, 1901
 Pseudotessellarctia ursina Schaus, 1892

References

Natural History Museum Lepidoptera generic names catalog

Phaegopterina
Moth genera